The International Presbyterian Church (IPC) is a Reformed church in the United Kingdom, the European Union and South Korea, that holds to the Presbyterian confession of faith, with common commitments, purpose and accountability and government.

Origin 
The church was founded by Francis Schaeffer as a missionary of the Reformed Presbyterian Church (RPCES) in the United States. Schaeffer and his wife began L'Abri ("the Shelter") and then started the International Presbyterian Church. They moved from Switzerland to England, bringing the church with them. The first congregation started in Ealing in 1969. They also created congregations among Korean-speaking people, including the London Korean Church.

Missionaries for the church worked in Timișoara, Targu Jiu, Verona, Italy, Ghent, Belgium and Baku, Azerbaijan.

Recently dissatisfied evangelical groups from the Church of Scotland have joined the church, with former ministers, elders and members creating the four new Scottish congregations out of existing Church of Scotland congregations. However, subsequently the Grace Community Church congregation located in Kyle of Lochalsh closed.

Organization
The IPC has four presbyteries, namely a British Presbytery, a European Proto-Presbytery, Korean Presbytery and a South-Korean Proto-Presbytery.

The British Presbytery comprises twelve English-speaking congregations in the United Kingdom.  They are:

England

Brentford, Immanuel
Derby, Christ Church
Ealing 
Ilford, All Nations Church
Liss, St Peters
Leeds: Christ Church Central
Romford, Christ Church Romford
Southall, New Life Masih Ghar
York, Trinity Church

Scotland

Aberdeen, Trinity Church
Inverness, Highland International Church
Larbert: Grace Church
Formerly, there was Grace Community Church, based in Kyle of Lochalsh, Scotland. It closed during 2020.

These Presbyteries form a synod.

Theology 
Westminster Confession of Faith
Three Forms of Unity
Belgic Confession
Canons of Dort
Heidelberg Catechism

The five statements of the Reformed doctrine:
Scripture Alone
Grace Alone
Faith Alone
Christ Alone
the Glory of God Alone

External links 
International Presbyterian Church
 London Korean Church
 list of churches

References 

Religious organisations based in England
Presbyterian denominations in Europe
Presbyterian denominations established in the 20th century
Presbyterianism in the United Kingdom
Presbyterianism in England
Reformed denominations in the United Kingdom
Presbyterianism in Scotland
Presbyterian denominations in Scotland
United Kingdom